The Bravest is a 2019 Chinese disaster film directed by Tony Chan and starring Huang Xiaoming, Tan Zhuo, Yang Zi, Zhang Zhehan, and Gao Ge. It is adapted from author Bao'erji Yuanye's non-fiction book The Deepest Water are Tears (最深的水是泪水). The film is based on a real-life incident, the Xingang Port oil spill, and chronicles firefighters' efforts to protect a city from a fire caused by an oil pipeline explosion.

The film is one of the seven films that premiered during the 70th anniversary of the People's Republic of China. It was released in China on August 1, 2019, and in the United States on August 9. The film grossed over CN¥1.7 billion (US$244 million) in China.

Plot 
A group of brave firefighters deal with a series of fires after a chemical plant explodes. It is a race against time for the firefighters as they put themselves in danger to save those in the vicinity of the fires.

References

External links 

 
 
 
 

2019 films
Polybona Films films
Chinese disaster films
Films about firefighting
Disaster films based on actual events
2010s Mandarin-language films